Dinocoryna arizonensis is a species in the family Staphylinidae ("rove beetles"), in the order Coleoptera ("beetles").
It is found in North America.

References

Further reading
 Arnett, R.H. Jr., M. C. Thomas, P. E. Skelley and J. H. Frank. (eds.). (2002). American Beetles, Volume II: Polyphaga: Scarabaeoidea through Curculionoidea. CRC Press LLC, Boca Raton, FL.
 Richard E. White. (1983). Peterson Field Guides: Beetles. Houghton Mifflin Company.
 Ross H. Arnett. (2000). American Insects: A Handbook of the Insects of America North of Mexico. CRC Press.
 Seevers, Charles H. (1978). "A generic and tribal revision of the North American Aleocharinae (Coleoptera: Staphylinidae)". Fieldiana (Zoology), vol. 71, vi + 289.

Staphylinidae
Beetles described in 1959